The Intel 82288 is a bus controller designed for Intel 80286. The chip is supplied in 20-pin DIP package. It replaces 8288 used with earlier processors.  Intel second sourced this chipset to Fujitsu Limited around 1985.  The 20-pin PLCC version was available in sampling for first quarter of 1986.

External links 
 www.datasheetarchive.com: 82288 Bus Controller for iAPX 286 Processors.

References 

Intel chipsets
IBM PC compatibles
Input/output integrated circuits